Istocheta is a genus of flies in the family Tachinidae.

Species
I. aldrichi (Mesnil, 1953)
I. altaica (Borisova-Zinovjeva, 1963)
I. bicolor (Villeneuve, 1937)
I. brevichirta Chao & Zhou, 1998
I. brevinychia Chao & Zhou, 1993
I. cinerea (Macquart, 1850)
I. cinerea Macquart, 1850
I. graciliseta Chao & Zhou, 1993
I. grossa (Chao, 1982)
I. hemichaeta (Brauer & von Bergenstamm, 1889)
I. leishanica Chao & Sun, 1993
I. longicauda Liang & Chao, 1995
I. longicornis (Fallén, 1810)
I. ludingensis Chao & Zhou, 1993
I. luteipes (Mesnil, 1953)
I. nigripedalis Yang & Chao, 1990
I. nyalamensis Liang & Chao, 1995
I. nyctia (Borisova-Zinovjeva, 1964)
I. polyphyllae (Villeneuve, 1917)
I. rufipes (Villeneuve, 1937)
I. shanxiensis (Chao & Liu, 1986)
I. subcinerea (Borisova-Zinoveva, 1966)
I. sublutescens Herting, 1975
I. subrufipes (Borisova-Zinovjeva, 1964)
I. torrida (Richter, 1976)
I. tricaudata Yang & Chao, 1990
I. zimini Borisova-Zinovjeva, 1964

References

Diptera of Asia
Diptera of Europe
Diptera of North America
Exoristinae
Tachinidae genera
Taxa named by Camillo Rondani